Camrose Colony is a census-designated place (CDP) and Hutterite colony in Spink County, South Dakota, United States. It was first listed as a CDP prior to the 2020 census. The CDP had a population of 76 at the 2020 census.

It is in the east-central part of the county, bordered to the east by Timber Creek, a south-flowing tributary of the James River.

Demographics

References 

Census-designated places in Spink County, South Dakota
Census-designated places in South Dakota
Hutterite communities in the United States